Cha Tae-hyun (born March 25, 1976) is a South Korean actor, singer, television personality, radio DJ and director. He is best known for his lead roles in the box-office hit comedies My Sassy Girl (2001), Scandal Makers (2008), Hello Ghost (2010) and fantasy drama action hit Along with the Gods: The Two Worlds (2017) as well as the television series Jeon Woo-chi (2012), The Producers (2015) and Police University (2021). He made his directorial debut with the variety-drama Hit the Top (2017), in which he also starred.

From 2012 to 2019, he was a cast member of the variety show 2 Days & 1 Night. He is a co-founder of the talent management agency Blossom Entertainment.

Career

1995–2000: Beginnings 
Cha Tae-hyun started his career as a silver medalist in a 1995 KBS Talent Contest. Over the next several years he would star in a large number of TV dramas such as Sunflower and Happy Together, while also appearing in numerous TV commercials. He was the radio DJ for KBS Cool FM's FM Popular Music with Cha Tae-hyun from 1999–2000, and made a minor film debut in the comedy Hallelujah.

2001–2007: My Sassy Girl and musical debut 
In 2001, he rose to fame through the hugely successful romantic comedy My Sassy Girl where he acted alongside Jun Ji-hyun. Cha's expressive acting established him as a recognized star in Korea as well as the Asian region at large, and he extended his fame by releasing his debut album Accident. His next film Lovers' Concerto (2002), a tragic melodrama with actresses Son Ye-jin and Lee Eun-ju, also proved to be a popular success.

From 2003, however, Cha's casting choices proved to be less inspired. He appeared in three comedies -- Crazy First Love,  Happy Ero Christmas and Two Guys —that were widely criticized by audiences for their weak scripts and lack of creativity. He released his second album The Book later that year.

His 2005 films—the relationship film Sad Movie with an all-star ensemble cast, and melodrama My Girl and I opposite Song Hye-kyo, the remake of Japanese hit film Crying Out Love in the Center of the World —were box office disappointments. 2007's Highway Star, in which he played a masked trot singer, was a moderate success.

Cha hosted KBS Cool FM's Mr. Radio from 2007–2008, and was awarded Best Radio DJ at the 2007 KBS Entertainment Awards alongside Ahn Jae-wook. He then portrayed the town's jester who has the intelligence of a six-year-old in BABO (which means "fool" in Korean), a film adaptation of Kang Full's popular online comic.

2008–2012: Revived popularity and 2 Days & 1 Night 
Cha regained his top star status when his comedy flick Scandal Makers became the number one film of 2008, attracting 8.2 million moviegoers and ranking among Korea's biggest hits of all time. The film centers on a radio talk show host, who was ex- idol, who must face unforeseen consequences of a love affair when he was a teen, when he discovers that he already has a daughter (Park Bo-young) and a grandson (Wang Seok-hyun) at the age of 30. As a result of the film's success, the advertising industry named Cha as the top male celebrity endorser of 2009.

He reunited with BABO director Kim Young-tak in 2010's Hello Ghost, a film about a man who after several suicide attempts, becomes possessed by four different ghosts. It was another box office success at 3 million tickets sold, and Cha's performance led him to be dubbed as "Korea's Jim Carrey."

Based on a true story, his 2011 film Champ depicts the relationship between a recently injured racehorse named Woo-bak and the jockey who tries to tame her. Cha spent time with the horse before and during filming, luring his four-legged partner with a combination of carrots and sugar cubes.

In 2012, he became a regular cast member of the second season of popular variety program 2 Days & 1 Night, and remained as a member until 2019. The show, which focuses on introducing various places in Korea to the viewers while the cast takes on different missions, has consistently scored high viewership ratings.

2013–2018: Continued success and directorial debut 
Cha played his first historical role in The Grand Heist, as the leader of a Joseon era group of thieves who band together to steal ice. The action-comedy film was produced by his brother Cha Ji-hyun. He took on another saeguk role as the titular character in TV series Jeon Woo-chi, an impish Taoist wizard who becomes an unlikely hero.

In 2014, he starred as an introverted man with dynamic visual acuity who works at a CCTV control center in the comedy film Slow Video, his third collaboration with director Kim Young-tak. This was followed by The Producers in 2015, in which Cha played a hot-headed but soft-hearted television producer.

In 2016, Cha reprised his role in My New Sassy Girl, a sequel to the 2001 hit film. However, the film did not live up to its predecessor and was a failure at the box office. The same year, he reunited with My Sassy Girl co-star Jun Ji-hyun in a cameo appearance in SBS's fantasy drama The Legend of the Blue Sea.

In 2017, Cha starred in the romantic comedy Because I Love You, playing a gifted composer who connects people in love; the film was again produced by his brother Cha Ji-hyun. He next starred in KBS2's variety-drama Hit the Top, which he also directs. The same year, Cha starred in the fantasy blockbuster Along With the Gods: The Two Worlds, based on the webtoon of the same name by Joo Ho-min.

In 2018, Cha starred in the romance drama Matrimonial Chaos, a remake of the Japanese television series of the same title.

2019–present
In March 2019, Cha was reported to have engaged in gambling, which was discovered through Jung Joon-young's phone's text messages during the police's investigation of the latter for illicit sex video crimes. Cha subsequently issued a formal statement of apology and withdrew from all his shows.

In 2020, Cha was cast in the crime detective drama Team Bulldog: Off-Duty Investigation.

In 2021, Cha starred in KBS2 drama Police University, playing Yoo Dong-man, a detective-turned-professor at the National Police University.

Personal life
Cha's father, Cha Jae-wan, was an assistant director for special effects at KBS, and his mother Choi Su-min, now retired, was a voice-over artist. His brother is film producer Cha Ji-hyeon.

On June 1, 2006, Cha married his high school sweetheart, pop lyricist Choi Suk-eun. They dated for 13 years; she was his first and only girlfriend. They have three children, a son (Cha Soo-chan) and two daughters (Cha Tae-eun, Cha Su-jin).

In 2011, Cha revealed on SBS talk show Healing Camp, Aren't You Happy that he has a panic disorder.

Filmography

Film

Television series

Web series

Variety show

Radio program

Discography

Studio albums

OST

Singles

Awards and nominations

Listicles

References

External links 

 
 
 

K-pop singers
IHQ (company) artists
South Korean pop singers
South Korean male film actors
South Korean male television actors
South Korean television presenters
South Korean radio presenters
Male actors from Seoul
Singers from Seoul
1976 births
Living people
20th-century South Korean male actors
21st-century South Korean male actors
South Korean television directors
21st-century South Korean  male singers
Seoul Institute of the Arts alumni
Chung-Ang University alumni
Kyonggi University alumni
Best New Actor Paeksang Arts Award (television) winners